This list of breweries in California, both current and defunct, includes both microbreweries and larger industrial scale breweries. Brewing companies range widely in the volume and variety of beer produced, ranging from small breweries to massive multinational conglomerates. Since 1983, California has allowed breweries to sell beer on their premises, giving rise to numerous brewpubs and microbreweries.

Breweries in California produce a wide range of beers in different styles that are marketed locally, regionally, nationally, and internationally. In 2012 California's 458 breweries, importers, brewpubs, and company-owned packagers and wholesalers employed over 7,000 people directly, and more than 109,000 others in related jobs such as wholesaling and retailing. Including people directly employed in brewing, as well as those who supply California's breweries with everything from ingredients to machinery, the total business and personal tax revenue generated by California's breweries and related industries was more than $5.1 billion. Consumer purchases of California's brewery products generated another $1.1 billion in tax revenue. In 2012, according to the Brewers Association, California ranked 1st in the number of craft breweries, and 19th per capita with 325.

For context, at the end of 2013 there were 2,822 breweries in the United States, including 2,768 craft breweries subdivided into 1,237 brewpubs, 1,412 microbreweries and 119 regional craft breweries. In that same year, according to the Beer Institute, the brewing industry employed around 43,000 Americans in brewing and distribution and had a combined economic impact of more than $246 billion.

Breweries by county

Alameda County
 21st Amendment Brewery in San Leandro
 Ale Industries in Oakland
 Altamont Beer Works in Livermore
 Bison Brewing in Berkeley (opened 1997, closed 2008)
 Buffalo Bill's Brewery in Hayward, the first brewpub licensed in California since Prohibition
 Cleophus Quealy Beer Company in San Leandro
 Diving Dog Brewhouse in Oakland
 Drake's Brewing Company in San Leandro
 Eight Bridges Brewing Company in Livermore
 Faction Brewing in Alameda
 Fieldwork Brewing Company in Berkeley
 Gilman Brewing Company in Berkeley 
 Hoi Polloi Brewpub and Beat Lounge in Berkeley
 JP DasBrew in Fremont
 Oakland United Beerworks (formerly Linden Street Brewery) in Oakland
 Old Kan Beer & Co. in Oakland
 Pacific Coast Brewing Company in Oakland (opened 1988, closed 2017)
 Pyramid Breweries in Berkeley (closed 2015)
 The Rare Barrel in Berkeley 
 Shadow Puppet Brewing Company in Livermore
 Triple Rock Brewery and Alehouse in Berkeley
 Trumer Brauerei in Berkeley
 Woods Bar & Brewery in Oakland
 Working Man Brewing Company in Livermore

Amador County 
 Amador Brewing Company in Plymouth

Butte County 

Feather Falls Casino Brewing Company in Oroville
 Feather River Brewing Company in Magalia
 NorCal Brewing in Chico
 Mulberry Station Brewing in Chico
 Sierra Nevada Brewing Company in Chico
 Secret Trail Brewing in Chico

Colusa County 
 Farmers Brewing Co. in Princeton

Contra Costa County 
 Black Diamond Brewing Co. in Concord (Closed 2017)
Calicraft in Walnut Creek
Danville Brewing Company in Danville
E.J. Phair Brewing Company in Pittsburg
 Farm Creek Brewing Company in Walnut Creek (Closed 2017) 
 Elevation 66 Brewing Company in El Cerrito
 Schubros Brewery in San Ramon
 Epidemic Ales in Concord

El Dorado County 
 The Brewery at Lake Tahoe in South Lake Tahoe
 Cold Water Brewery and Grill in South Lake Tahoe
 Cool Beerwerks in Cool
 El Dorado Brewing Company in Diamond Springs
 Gold Hill Winery and Brewery in Placerville
 HWY 50 Brewery in Camino
 Jack Russell Farm Brewery in Camino
 Lake Tahoe AleWorX in South Lake Tahoe
 Mraz Brewing Company in El Dorado Hills
 Outbreak Brewing Company in Placerville
 Outpost Brewing Company in South Lake Tahoe
 Placerville Brewing Company in Placerville
 Sidellis Lake Tahoe in South Lake Tahoe
 Solid Ground Brewing in Diamond Springs
 South Lake Brewing Company in South Lake Tahoe
 Stash Brewing Co. in Garden Valley
 Stateline Brewery and Restaurant in South Lake Tahoe

Fresno County
 The Mad Duck Craft Brewery in Fresno
 Fresno Brewing Company in Fresno
 Full Circle Brewing in Fresno
 Pine & Palm Brewing in Fresno
 Tactical OPS Brewing in Fresno
 Tioga–Sequoia Brewing Company in Fresno

Humboldt County 
 Eel River Brewing Company in Fortuna
 Humboldt Brewing Company
 Lost Coast Brewery in Eureka
 Mad River Brewing Company in Blue Lake
 Redwood Curtain Brewing Company in Arcata
 Six Rivers Brewery in McKinleyville

Inyo County 
 Mountain Rambler Brewery in Bishop

Kern County 
 Crusader Brewing in Bakersfield
 Dionysus Brewing Company in Bakersfield
 Great Change Brewing in Bakersfield
 Kern River Brewing Company in Kernville
 Lengthwise Brewing in Bakersfield
 Local Craft Beer in Tehachapi
 Temblor Brewing Company in Bakersfield

Kings County 
 Bird Street Brewing in Lemoore
 Hop Forged Brewing Company in Hanford

Lake County 
 Kelsey Creek Brewing Company in Kelseyville
 Mount St. Helena Brewing Company in Middletown
 O'Meara Brothers Brewing Company in Lakeport

Los Angeles County 
 Absolution Brewing Company in Torrance
 Alosta Brewing Co in Covina
 Ambitious Ales in Long Beach
Angel City Brewery in Los Angeles
Beachwood BBQ and Brewery in Long Beach
Bravery Brewing in Lancaster
Brouwerij West in San Pedro
Congregation Ale House in Azusa
Cosmic Brewery in Torrance
 Claremont Craft Ales in Claremont
 The Dudes' Brewing Company in Torrance
 Eagle Rock Brewery in Los Angeles
 El Segundo Brewing Company in El Segundo
 Golden Road Brewery in Los Angeles
 Gordon Biersch Brewing Company in Burbank
 Hand-Brewed Beer in Chatsworth
 Highland Park Brewery in Los Angeles
 Homage Brewing in Pomona
 Karl Strauss Brewing Company in Universal City
 Kinetic Brewing Company in Lancaster
 King Harbor Brewing Company in Redondo Beach
 Lagunitas Brewing Company in Azusa 
 Liberation Brewing Company in Long Beach
 Long Beach Beer Lab in Long Beach
 MacLeod Ale Brewing Company in Los Angeles
 MillerCoors brewery in Irwindale
 Monkish Brewing Company in Torrance
 Mumford Brewing in Los Angeles 
 Ohana Brewing Company in Los Angeles
 Pacific Plate Brewing Company in Monrovia
 Progress Brewing in South El Monte
 Red Car Brewery in Torrance
Sanctum Brewing Company in Pomona (closed 2020) 
Scholb Premium Ales in Torrance
 Smog City Brewing Company in Torrance
 Strand Brewing Company in Torrance
 Trademark Brewing Company in Long Beach
 Timeless Pints Brewing Company in Lakewood
Three Weavers Brewing Company in Inglewood

Madera County 
 South Gate Brewing Company in Oakhurst

Marin County 
 Adobe Creek Brewing in Novato
 Indian Valley Brewing in Novato
 Iron Springs Pub & Brewery in Fairfax
 Marin Brewing in Larkspur
 Moylan's Brewery in Novato
 Pond Farm Brewing in San Rafael
 The State Room in San Rafael

Mariposa County 
 Yosemite Ale Werks in Mariposa

Mendocino County 
 Anderson Valley Brewing Company in Boonville
 Mendocino Brewing Company in Ukiah
 North Coast Brewing Company in Fort Bragg

Merced County 
 Bobcat Brewing Company in Merced

Mono County 
 Mammoth Brewing Company in Mammoth Lakes
 June Lake Brewing in June Lake

Monterey County 
 Alvarado Street Brewery in Monterey
 Cannery Row Brewing Company in Monterey
 English Ales in Marina
 Peter B's Brew Pub in Monterey
 Yeast of Eden in Carmel

Napa County 
 Calistoga Inn, Restaurant and Brewing in Calistoga
 Downtown Joe's Brewery in Napa
 Mad Fritz in St. Helena             
 Napa Smith Brewery in Napa
 St. Clair Brown in Napa             
 Stone Brewing in Napa    
 Tannery Bend Beerworks in Napa     
 Trade Brewing in Napa

Nevada County 
 1849 Brewing Company in Grass Valley
 Boca Brewing Company in Boca (opened 1876, closed 1893)
 FiftyFifty Brewing Company in Truckee
 Grass Valley Brewing in Grass Valley
 Nevada Brewery in Nevada City
 Good Wolf Brewing Company in Truckee
 Three Forks Bakery & Brewing Company in Nevada City

Orange County 
 Anaheim Brewery in Anaheim
 Barley Forge Brewing Company in Costa Mesa (closed in 2019)
 Brewing Reserve of California in Costa Mesa
 Bootlegger's Brewery in Fullerton and Costa Mesa
 Bottle Logic Brewing, Anaheim
 The Bruery in Placentia
 Cismontane Brewing Company in Santa Ana
 Everywhere Beer in Orange
 The Good Beer Company in Santa Ana (closed in 2020)
 Green Cheek Beer Company in Orange and Costa Mesa 
 Gunwhale Ales in Costa Mesa
 Laguna Beach Beer Company in Rancho Santa Margarita and Laguna Beach
 Left Coast Brewing Company in San Clemente and Irvine
 Network Brewery in Santa Ana
 Noble Ale Works in Anaheim
 Old Orange Brewing Company in Orange
 Radiant Brewing Co. in Anaheim
 Riip Beer Company in Huntington Beach
 Steelhead Brewing in Irvine (opened in 1995, closed in 2013)
 TAPS Brewery & Barrel Room in Tustin
 Tustin Brewing Company in Tustin
 Valiant Brewing Company in Orange

Placer County 
 Auburn Alehouse in Auburn
 Boneshaker Public House and Community Brewery in Rocklin
 Crooked Lane Brewing Company in Auburn
 GoatHouse Brewing Company in Lincoln
 Knee Deep Brewing Company in Auburn
 Loomis Basin Brewing Company in Loomis
 Moksa Brewing in Rocklin
 Moonraker Brewing Company in Auburn
 Out of Bounds Brewing Company in Rocklin
Slice Beer Company in Lincoln
 The Monk's Cellar in Roseville

Plumas County
The Brewing Lair of the Lost Sierra (formerly UnderCover Ale Works) in Blairsden-Graeagle
 Waganupa Brewing in Chester
Quintopia Brewing Co in Quincy

Riverside County 
 Aftershock Brewing Company in Temecula
 Area 51 Craft Brewery in Riverside (closed) 
Babe's BBQ & Brewhouse in Rancho Mirage
 Black Market Brewing Company in Temecula
 Blind Pig Brewing Company in Temecula (opened 1994, closed 1997)
Brew Rebellion in Banning (closed 2020)
Coachella Valley Brewing in Thousand Palms
Craft Brewing Company in Lake Elsinore
Desert Beer Company in Palm Desert
8 Bit Brewing in Murrieta
 Electric Brewing Company in Murrieta
Euryale in Riverside
Evans Brewing in Corona
Garage Brewing in Temecula
GreyWolf Brewing Co in Norco
Heroes Restaurant & Brewery in Riverside
Idyllwild Brewpub in Idyllwild
 Inland Empire Brewing Company in Riverside (closed)
Inland Wharf Brewing in Murrieta
 Ironfire Brewing Company in Temecula
Karl Strauss Brewing Company brewpub in Temecula
La Quinta Brewing in Palm Desert
Las Palmas Brewing in Palm Springs
Main Street Brewery in Corona
Mason Jar Brewing in Menifee
Oscar's Brewing Company in Temecula
Packinghouse Brewing in Riverside
 Refuge Brewery in Temecula
Relentless in Temecula
Route 30 Brewing in Riverside
Skyland Ale Works in Corona
Stone Church Brewing in Corona
Storytellers Brewery & Meet House in Corona
Temecula Brewing Company in Temecula
Thompson Brewing in Riverside
Wicks Brewing in Riverside
 Wiens Brewing Company in Temecula
Woody's Brewhouse in Moreno Valley

Sacramento County 
 Alaro Brewing in Sacramento
 At Ease Brewing in Sacramento
 Big Sexy Brewing in Sacramento
 Big Stump Brew Co. in Sacramento
 Buffalo Brewery in Sacramento (closed mid 1970s)
 Burning Barrel Brewing in Rancho Cordova 
 Claimstake Brewing in Rancho Cordova
 Delta Borne Brewing in Sacramento
 Device Brewing Company in Sacramento
 Dreaming Dog Brewery in Elk Grove
 Flatland Brewing in Elk Grove
 Fort Rock Brewing in Rancho Cordova
 Fountainhead Brewing in Sacramento
 King Cong Brewing Company in Sacramento
 New Glory Craft Brewery in Sacramento
 New Helvetia Brewing in Sacramento
 Oak Park Brewing in Sacramento
 Palm Tree Brewing Company in Orangevale
 Porchlight Brewing in Sacramento
 Red Bus Brewing in Folsom
 River Rock Brewery in Galt
 Rubicon Brewing Company in Sacramento, opened in 1987, closed in 2017.
  Brewing in Sacramento
 Tower Brewing in Sacramento
 Track 7 Brewing Company in Sacramento
 Tilted Mash Brewing in Elk Grove
 Urban Roots Brewing in Sacramento

San Bernardino County 
 3 Iron Brewing Co. in Colton
Braemar Brewing in Ontario
Brewcaipa in Yucaipa
 Desert Barn Brewery in Hesperia
Dragon's Tale in Montclair
 Escape Craft Brewery in Redlands
Hamilton Family Brewery in Rancho Cucamonga
 Hangar 24 Craft Brewery in Redlands
Hops & Spokes Brewing in Yucaipa
 I & I Brewing in Chino
 Kings Brewing in Rancho Cucamonga
Lake Arrowhead Brewing in Lake Arrowhead
Last Name Brewing in Upland
No Clue Brewing in Rancho Cucamonga
 Oak Hills Brewing Company in Hesperia
Off the Grid Brewing in Apple Valley
Our Brew in Redlands
Rescue Brewing in Upland
Revolt in Montclair
 Ritual Brewing Co. in Redlands
Rök House Brewing in Upland
 Rowdy's Brew Co. in Rancho Cucamonga
Sandbox Brewing in Montclair
Solorio Brewing in Rancho Cucamonga
 Sour Cellars in Rancho Cucamonga
The Stout House in Upland
 Strum Brewing in Ontario

San Diego County

San Francisco City and County 
 21st Amendment Brewery
 Acme Brewery (opened 1907; closed 1958) 
 Albion Brewery (opened 1870; closed 1919) 
 Almanac Beer Company
 Anchor Brewing Company
 Barrel Head Brewhouse
 Beach Chalet Brewery & Restaurant
 Black Sands Brewery
 Black Hammer Brewing
 Cellarmaker Brewing Company
Eagle Brewery
Enterprise Brewery
 Fort Point Beer Company
Golden City Brewery
 Hamm's Brewery (opened 1954, closed 1972)
 Harmonic Brewing 
Hibernia Brewery
 Jackson Brewing Company (opened 1859, closed during Prohibition)
 Laughing Monk Brewing
Lafayette Brewery
 Local Brewing Company
 Magnolia Brewing Company
 Rainier Brewing Company (opened 1933, closed 1953)
 San Francisco Brewing Company (opened 1985, closed 2009)
Schuster's Railroad Brewery
Seven Stills
 Southern Pacific Brewing
 Speakeasy Ales and Lagers
 Sunset Reservoir Brewing Company
 Thirsty Bear Brewing Company
 Triple Voodoo Brewing
Washington Brewery
Willow's Brewery

San Joaquin County 
 Dancing Fox Winery and Brewery in Lodi
 Five Window Beer Company in Lodi
 High Water Brewing Company in Lodi
 Idol Beer Works in Lodi
 Lodi Beer Company in Lodi
 Morgan Territory Brewing in Tracy

San Luis Obispo County
 927 Beer Company in Cambria 
 Central Coast Brewing in San Luis Obispo
 Firestone Walker Brewing Company in Paso Robles
 Libertine Brewing Company in San Luis Obispo
 Liquid Gravity in San Luis Obispo
 Tap It Brewing Company in San Luis Obispo
 There Does Not Exist (∄) in San Luis Obispo

San Mateo County 
 Blue Oak Brewing Company in San Carlos
 Devil's Canyon Brewing Company in San Carlos
 Half Moon Bay Brewing Company in Princeton-by-the-Sea
 Highway 1 Brewing in Pescadero
 Hop Dogma Brewing in El Granada
 Sacrilege Brewery + Kitchen in Half Moon Bay
 Alpha Acid Brewing Company in Belmont

Santa Barbara County 
 Captain Fatty's Brewery in Goleta
 Draughtsmen Aleworks in Goleta
 Figueroa Mountain Brewing Company in Buellton
 Firestone Walker Brewing Company in Buellton
 Island Brewing Company in Carpinteria
 M. Special Brewing Company in Goleta
 Pure Order Brewing Company in Santa Barbara
 Solvang Brewing Company in Solvang 
 Telegraph Brewing Company in Santa Barbara
 Third Window Brewing in Santa Barbara

Santa Clara County 
 Clandestine Brewing in San Jose 
 El Toro Brewing Company in Morgan Hill
 Gordon Biersch Brewing Company in San Jose
 Hermitage Brewing Company in San Jose 
 Kelly Brewing in Morgan Hill
 Mayfield Brewery (opened 1868, closed 1920)

Santa Cruz County 
 Discretion Brewing in Soquel
 Fruition Brewing Co. in Watsonville
 Greater Purpose Brewing Co. in Santa Cruz
 Humble Sea Brewing Co. in Santa Cruz
 New Bohemia Brewing Company in Capitola
 Private Press Brewing in Santa Cruz
 Santa Cruz Mountain Brewing in Santa Cruz
 Sante Adairius Rustic Ales in Capitola
 Seabright Brewery in Santa Cruz
 Shanty Shack Brewing in Santa Cruz
 Steel Bonnet Brewing Company in Scotts Valley
 Uncommon Brewers in Santa Cruz
 Woodhouse Brewing & Blending in Santa Cruz

Siskiyou County 

 Dunsmuir Brewery Works in Dunsmuir
 Etna Brewing Company in Etna 
 Mt. Shasta Brewing Company in Weed
 Siskiyou Brew Works

Solano County 
 Anheuser-Busch InBev brewery in Fairfield
 Heretic Brewing Company in Fairfield
 Right Eye Brewery in Suisun
 Mare Island Brewing Company in Vallejo

Sonoma County 
 Bear Republic Brewing Company in Healdsburg
 Carneros Brewing Company in Sonoma
 Fogbelt Brewing Company in Santa Rosa
 Lagunitas Brewing Company in Petaluma
 Moonlight Brewing Company in Santa Rosa
 New Albion Brewing Company in Sonoma (opened 1976, closed 1982)
 Old Redwood Brewing Company in Windsor
 Petaluma Hills Brewing Company in Petaluma
 Russian River Brewing Company in Santa Rosa
 Sonoma Springs Brewing Company in Sonoma
 CUVER Belgian Brewers of Sonoma County in Windsor
 Stumptown Brewery in Guerneville
 Third Street Aleworks in Santa Rosa

Stanislaus County 
 Dust Bowl Brewing Company in Turlock
 St. Stan's Brewery in Modesto

Tehama County
 Paskenta Brewery and Distillery in Corning

Trinity County
• Trinity County Brewing Company in Weaverville

Ventura County
 Anacapa Brewing in Ventura
 Casa Agria Specialty Ales in Ventura
 Enegren Brewing Co. in Moorpark
 Flat Fish Brewing Company in Camarillo
 Institution Ale Co. in Camarillo
 Leashless Brewing Co. in Ventura
 MadeWest Brewing in Ventura
 Poseidon Brewing Company in Ventura. 
 Red Tandem Brewery in Ventura
 Surf Brewery in Ventura
 Topa Topa Brewing Company in Ventura
Ventura Coast Brew Co. in Ventura
 Westlake Brewing Co. in Westlake Village

Yolo County
 Bike Dog Brewing Company in West Sacramento
 Dunloe Brewing in Davis
 Jackrabbit Brewing Company in West Sacramento
 Sudwerk Privatbrauerei Hubsch in Davis
 Super Owl Brewing in Davis
 Three Mile Brewing Company in Davis
 Yolo Brewing in West Sacramento

See also 
 Beer in the United States
 History of California wine
 List of breweries in the United States
 List of microbreweries

References

Further reading

External links
 
 California breweries directory at RateBeer.com

California
Lists of buildings and structures in California
Lists of companies based in California